ABC song or similar terms may refer to:

 Alphabet song, any song intended to help teach an alphabet, including "The A.B.C.", a popular alphabet song for children first copyrighted in 1835
 "ABC" (The Jackson 5 song), 1970
 "ABC", a song by Jin from the album ABC
 "ABC", a song by the Pipettes from the album We Are The Pipettes, 2006
 "ABC", a 1986 song by Anna Book
 "ABCs" (song), a 2008 song by K'naan
 "ABC-123", a 1993 song by LeVert
 "ABCDEath", a song by Psychostick from the album We Couldn't Think of a Title
 "ABC 123", a song by Mel B from the album Hot, 2000
 "ABC–DEF–GHI", a 1969 song sung by Big Bird on the American public television children's show ''Sesame Street

See also
 ABC (band), English new wave band